Milivoje Vitakić (born 16 May 1977) is a Serbian former footballer who played as a defender.

Club career
Vitakić started out at his hometown club Borac Čačak, making his senior debut in 1995. He was acquired by Čukarički in 1997. In the summer of 1998, Vitakić was transferred to Red Star Belgrade. He spent the following six seasons with the Crveno-beli, winning three domestic league titles (2000, 2001 and 2004) and four national cups (1999, 2000, 2002 and 2004). In the summer of 2004, Vitakić moved abroad to France and signed with Lille. He stayed there for three years, before switching to fellow French club Grenoble.

International career
At international level, Vitakić was capped twice for Serbia and Montenegro, making both appearances under manager Ilija Petković in 2004.

Honours
Red Star Belgrade
 First League of Serbia and Montenegro: 1999–2000, 2000–01, 2003–04
 Serbia and Montenegro Cup: 1998–99, 1999–2000, 2001–02, 2003–04

Notes

References

External links
 
 

Association football defenders
Expatriate footballers in France
First League of Serbia and Montenegro players
FK Borac Čačak players
FK Čukarički players
Grenoble Foot 38 players
Ligue 1 players
Ligue 2 players
Lille OSC players
Red Star Belgrade footballers
Serbia and Montenegro expatriate footballers
Serbia and Montenegro expatriate sportspeople in France
Serbia and Montenegro footballers
Serbia and Montenegro international footballers
Serbia and Montenegro under-21 international footballers
Serbian expatriate footballers
Serbian expatriate sportspeople in France
Serbian footballers
Sportspeople from Čačak
1977 births
Living people